Sabse Bada Rupaiya (English: Money is the Greatest) is a 1955 Hindi film made by P. L. Santoshi and starring Agha, Shashikala in lead roles.

Cast 
 Shashikala as Laxmi
 Agha as Kishan
 Sunder as Rajaram
 Nana Palsikar
 Achla Sachdev
 Krishnakant
 Kundan

Music
The music was composed by O. P. Nayyar (6 songs) & Nashad (3 songs). All songs were written by P. L. Santoshi and Majrooh Sultanpuri. 

 Out of these 9 songs, the first 3 songs are music by Nashad & the rest 6 songs are music by O. P. Nayyar.

External links 
 
 Movie Credits

1955 films
1950s Hindi-language films
Films scored by Naushad
Films scored by O. P. Nayyar